This list of psychology awards is an index to articles about notable awards given for work in the fields of psychology, cognitive sciences and psychiatry.

List

See also
 Lists of awards
 Lists of science and technology awards
 List of medicine awards

References

 
Psychology
Awards, list of